is a Japanese professional golfer.

Kimura played on the Japan Golf Tour, winning four times.

Professional wins (4)

Japan Golf Tour wins (3)

Other wins (1)
1992 Kansai Open

External links

Japanese male golfers
Japan Golf Tour golfers
Sportspeople from Osaka Prefecture
1960 births
Living people